Dunjeon Station is a station of the Everline in Dunjeon-ri, Pogok-eup, Cheoin-gu, Yongin, South Korea.

External links
  information from Everline

Everline
Metro stations in Yongin
Railway stations opened in 2013